Boyd is a city in Lac qui Parle County, Minnesota, United States. The population was 175 at the 2010 census.

History
Boyd was platted in 1884. A post office has been in operation at Boyd since 1884. The city was incorporated in 1893.

Geography

Demographics

2010 census
As of the census of 2010, there were 175 people, 88 households, and 43 families living in the city. The racial makeup of the city was 94.9% White, 0.6% Asian, and 4.6% from other races. Hispanic or Latino of any race were 4.6% of the population.

There were 88 households, of which 17.0% had children under the age of 18 living with them, 37.5% were married couples living together, 4.5% had a female householder with no husband present, 6.8% had a male householder with no wife present, and 51.1% were non-families. 43.2% of all households were made up of individuals, and 17% had someone living alone who was 65 years of age or older. The average household size was 1.99 and the average family size was 2.63.

The median age in the city was 49.2 years. 17.7% of residents were under the age of 18; 7.4% were between the ages of 18 and 24; 19.4% were from 25 to 44; 34.9% were from 45 to 64; and 20.6% were 65 years of age or older. The gender makeup of the city was 56.0% male and 44.0% female.

2000 census
As of the census of 2000, there were 210 people, 100 households, and 52 families living in the city. The racial makeup of the city was 97.62% White, 1.43% Native American and 0.95% Asian.

There were 100 households, out of which 18.0% had children under the age of 18 living with them, 42.0% were married couples living together, 7.0% had a female householder with no husband present, and 48.0% were non-families. 39.0% of all households were made up of individuals, and 16.0% had someone living alone who was 65 years of age or older.  The average household size was 2.10 and the average family size was 2.88.

In the city, the population was spread out, with 19.0% under the age of 18, 8.1% from 18 to 24, 30.5% from 25 to 44, 27.1% from 45 to 64, and 15.2% who were 65 years of age or older.  The median age was 42 years. For every 100 females, there were 103.9 males.  For every 100 females age 18 and over, there were 107.3 males.

The median income for a household in the city was $30,625, and the median income for a family was $41,500. Males had a median income of $21,591 versus $17,955 for females. The per capita income for the city was $16,917.  About 4.0% of families and 6.8% of the population were below the poverty line, including none of those under the age of eighteen and 5.4% of those 65 or over.

References

External links
 Dawson-Boyd Schools -- Official site

Cities in Minnesota
Cities in Lac qui Parle County, Minnesota